Tauragė County (Lithuanian: Tauragės apskritis) is one of ten counties in Lithuania.  It is in the west of the country, and its capital is Tauragė. On 1 July 2010, the county administration was abolished, and since that date, Tauragė County remains as the territorial and statistical unit.

Municipalities

Population by municipality

References

External links
 Social and demographic characteristics of Tauragė County
 Economy of Tauragė County
 Environment of Tauragė County

 
Counties of Lithuania